The U.S. Commission for the Preservation of America's Heritage Abroad is an independent agency of the Government of the United States of America. The law directs the Commission to identify and report on cemeteries, monuments, and historic buildings in Eastern and Central Europe that are associated with the heritage of U.S. citizens, particularly endangered properties. The law also directs the Commission to obtain, in cooperation with the U.S. Department of State, assurances from the governments of the region that the properties will be protected and preserved.

In addition to the types of sites specified in the law, the Commission also seeks the preservation of similar types of properties, including related archival material. It, additionally, encourages and facilitates private and foreign government restoration and preservation projects.

The establishment of the Commission recognized that the population of the United States is mostly immigrants and their descendants. Because it is, the United States has an interest in the preservation of sites in other countries. These sites are an important part of the cultural heritage of many Americans.

The Holocaust and 45 years of atheistic, Communist governments created a critical need that led to the Commission’s establishment. The Holocaust annihilated much of Europe's Jewish population, killing most Jews and forcing others to flee. In many countries, none were left to continue to care for the communal properties that represented a historic culture in the area and constitute an integral part of Judaism. (Burial places are sacred in Judaism.)

The destruction, desecration, and deterioration of properties under the Nazis persisted under subsequent Communist regimes. Additionally, Cold War tensions hindered access by Americans who wanted to ensure preservation of the sites.

Many properties continue to be endangered. Governments and communities in the region face fundamental and competing challenges. Some Jewish sites have also been affected by a resurgence of anti-Semitism.

The Commission consists of 21 members appointed by the President. Of these, seven are appointed in consultation with the Speaker of the U.S. House of Representatives and seven are appointed in consultation with the President Pro Tempore of the U.S. Senate. The Members are appointed for three-year terms, although they continue to serve until they are replaced. They are not paid for their service.

One Member is designated by the President to chair the Commission. January 2022 President Joe Biden appointed Star Jones to chair the Commission. Former chairs include Lesley Weiss, Warren L. Miller, Michael Lewan, Rabbi Arthur Schneier, Israel Rubin, and Betty Heitman.

Activities 
The Commission cooperates with Kazakhstan in the sphere of preservation of cultural heritage. "The Commission signed a Memorandum of Understanding with the Kazakh Culture and Sports Ministry in October 2018 to strengthen cultural and humanitarian cooperation between Kazakhstan and the United States."

Controversies

Conflict of interest issue 
In September 2015, news articles began to question whether a consultant who had assisted the Commission on a part-time basis for many years with the nominal title of executive director in the past had a conflict of interest because he had previously lobbied the federal government for Puerto Rico and Palau. In November, the Office of Special Counsel raised issues regarding the Commission’s historic use of contractors, including in its hiring of the firm for which Farrow worked, paying it from $80,000 to just over $100,000 a year. The Commission noted that it never had an actual executive director because of funding limitations and it had discussed the contracting and Farrow’s role with a range of Federal authorities. It also rejected the suggestion of a conflict of interest because Farrow’s lobbying was totally unrelated to the Commission’s jurisdiction and pointed out that it had previously sought funding for hiring government employees and flexibility in contracting, both of which it subsequently obtained.

Trump appointment of alleged white supremacist
On November 18, 2020, President Donald Trump named Darren Beattie to the commission. He had previously been fired as a White House speechwriter due to alleged white supremacist ties. Numerous organizations, including those representing the Jewish community, objected to the appointment.

Notes and references

1). http://www.heritageabroad.gov
2). http://www.rickshaw.org/commission.html
3). http://jta.org/news/article/2009/11/12/1009143/president-obama-appoints-jewish-preservation-advocate-to-key-administration-post
4). http://jta.org/news/article/2009/05/18/1005207/op-ed-europeans-still-need-holocaust-lessons

External links 
 

Independent agencies of the United States government